Matthew James Rhead (born 31 May 1984) is an English professional footballer, who plays as a forward for National League North club Alfreton Town.

He notably spent two successful professional spells with both Mansfield Town and Lincoln City where he won promotion to the Football League with both and saw further success with The Imps that yielded an EFL Trophy triumph and later the EFL League Two title. Prior to his time at Mansfield he had come up through Non-League football and had played for Norton United, Kidsgrove Athletic, Eastwood Town, Nantwich Town, Congleton Town and Corby Town. Following his release from Lincoln he has returned back to playing at a semi-professional level and has turned out for both Billericay Town and Boreham Wood.

Career

Early career
Rhead was born in Stoke-on-Trent and played for nearby non-league sides Norton United  and Stallington before joining Kidsgrove Athletic ahead of the 2004–2005 season. He moved on to join Eastwood Town, making a goal scoring debut in the club's 2–3 home defeat to Matlock Town on 16 October 2007. The fee was a record for the two clubs and Rhead would end the season as Eastwood's top goalscorer of the season having netted 17 goals from 26 starts. At the end of September 2008, he rejoined Kidsgrove Athletic on a month's loan but with the loan restricting him only to league games, he started only a single game before returning to Eastwood at the end of the loan period. He departed Eastwood to join Nantwich Town for the start of the 2009–2010 season before joining Congleton Town on an initial month's loan, making a goalscoring debut in the club's draw with Squires Gate on 12 December 2009; after a month's loan he agreed terms to join the club on a permanent basis until the end of the 2009–10 season. Having been invited for pre-season training with Eastwood Town he rejoined the club he had first joined for £4000 from Kidsgrove back in October 2007. He joined Corby Town from Eastwood Town in June 2011.

Mansfield Town
He signed for Mansfield Town in January 2012, and scored two goals in 17 games in the 2011–12 season. In July 2012, he quit his job as a team leader at JCB to become a full-time professional footballer. He then scored five goals in 37 games in the 2012–13 campaign as the "Stags" won promotion into the Football League as champions of the Conference Premier.

Lincoln City
Rhead signed a two-year contract with Lincoln City on 14 May 2015. The following year he handed in a transfer request and was set to join Barrow, but the arrival of Danny Cowley as Lincoln manager persuaded him to stay at the club, and he finished the 2016-17 season as Lincoln's top scorer as they won the National League. The same year he, played an important part in Lincoln's record-breaking run to the quarter-finals of the FA Cup, gaining fame when Joey Barton took a dive in an attempt to get him sent off during Lincoln's win at Burnley.

Billericay Town
Following two promotions from the National League to League One with Lincoln City, Rhead began to find his opportunities at Lincoln decreasing, and on 25 July 2019, Rhead signed for Billericay Town on a two-year deal for an undisclosed fee. On 16 October 2019, after only two months with the club, Rhead departed after the club's chairman and director resigned.

Alfreton Town
On 2 July 2021, Rhead joined Alfreton Town following his departure from Boreham Wood. The striker was awarded with the Supporters' Player of the Year Award following the conclusion of the 2021/22 campaign.

Career statistics

Honours

Club
Mansfield Town
Conference Premier: 2012–13

Lincoln City
National League: 2016–17
EFL Trophy: 2017–18
EFL League Two: 2018–19

References

External links

1984 births
Living people
Footballers from Stoke-on-Trent
English footballers
Association football forwards
Norton United F.C. players
Kidsgrove Athletic F.C. players
Eastwood Town F.C. players
Nantwich Town F.C. players
Congleton Town F.C. players
Corby Town F.C. players
Mansfield Town F.C. players
Lincoln City F.C. players
Billericay Town F.C. players
Boreham Wood F.C. players
Alfreton Town F.C. players
National League (English football) players
English Football League players